Branston is an English food brand best known for the original Branston Pickle, a jarred pickled chutney first made in 1922 in the village of Branston near Burton upon Trent, Staffordshire by Crosse & Blackwell. The Branston factory proved to be uneconomical, and production was moved to Crosse & Blackwell subsidiary, E Lazenby & Sons in Bermondsey, London, where it invested in new buildings in 1924 and 1926, which remained in use until 1969.

In 2004, the pickle business was sold by Nestlé to Premier Foods and production was moved to Bury St Edmunds in Suffolk. Premier Foods sold the brand to Mizkan in 2013, at which time it ceased to be labelled as Crosse and Blackwell because in Europe this name was sold separately to Princes Group. Over 17 million jars a year are sold in the UK.

Original pickle

Branston Pickle is made from a variety of diced vegetables, including swede, carrots, onions and cauliflower pickled in a sauce made from vinegar, tomato, apple and spices.
Branston Pickle is sweet and spicy with a chutney-like consistency, containing chunks of vegetables in a thick brown sticky sauce. It is commonly served as part of a ploughman's lunch, a popular menu item in British pubs. It is also frequently combined with cheddar cheese in sandwiches, and many sandwich shops in the UK offer cheese and pickle as an option. It is available in the standard 'chunky' version, a 'small chunk' variety, and a 'smooth' variety that is pureed, which makes it easier to spread onto bread; convenient squeeze-bottle packs are amongst the range. Branston also has flavoured pickles including Sweet Chilli and Beetroot flavoured pickle.

Brand extension
Additional Branston products include mayonnaise, tomato ketchup, brown sauce, salad cream, and baked beans.

In October 2005, Premier Foods launched Branston Baked Beans. The marketing and promotion of this product was aimed at challenging Heinz's dominance of the UK baked bean market. This marketing included an advert, featuring a Branston Bean Tin explaining how Branston Beans are very "saucy". Promotional activities included a 'Great British Bean Poll' where members of the public across the country were invited to blind taste both 'the brand leader' (assumed to be Heinz) and Branston. In the poll, 76% of participants picked Branston over Heinz. Heinz elected to change their recipe in the face of this aggressive activity.

Premier Foods also attempted to leverage the traditional Branston Pickle brand name by producing Branston Relishes in four different flavours: Hot Chilli & Jalapeño, Gherkin, Sweet Onion and Tomato & Red Pepper.

Around November 2015, a sweet chili-flavoured pickle was launched, and the brand's rich and fruity sauce was re-launched, along with two new sauce flavours, rich and spicy and rich and smoky. In 2017, Branston launched its tomato ketchup, mayonnaise and brown sauce lines in single-serving sachet packaging.

Walkers once produced a variety of crisps called "Cheese and Branston Pickle".

Sale to Mizkan

In late 2012, it was announced that as part of an aggressive debt reduction strategy, Premier Foods would be selling the Branston brand to Japanese food manufacturer Mizkan Group for £92.5 million, joining Sarson's vinegar and Hayward's pickled onions as recent Premier Foods to Mizkan brand acquisitions. The Bury St Edmunds plant continues to manufacture Branston products.

Availability outside the UK
Branston Pickle is sold in Ireland, the United States, Canada, Australia, New Zealand, Norway, France, Denmark, Malta, Singapore (Cold Storage and Market Place), Germany (REWE and Globus Warenhaus), Turkey (Kipa), the Netherlands, the Czech Republic, Slovakia (Tesco), Belgium (Carrefour Market Etterbeek), Hong Kong (Taste), Indonesia (Kemchicks), South Africa, Southern Spain (Supersol and Carrefour), Thailand (Chiang Mai, Rimping), Vietnam, Angola and Namibia.

See also

 Anglo-Indian cuisine
 List of brand name condiments
 List of chutneys
 Major Grey's Chutney

References

External links

 Branston Pickle on the Mizkan website
 Branston Pickle Facebook Page
 Branston Pickle Twitter Account

Food brands of the United Kingdom
English brands
1922 establishments in England
British condiments
Mizkan brands
Brand name condiments
Brown sauces